Major General Charles Okidi, is a senior Ugandan military officer in the Uganda People's Defence Force (UPDF). He is the Chief of Staff of the UPDF Air Force, effective 11 December 2019. Before that, he was the Director Operations at the UPDF Air Force Headquarters at Entebbe.

Work history
Okidi serves as a long-term presidential pilot, concurrently with his military duties. He has previously served as the Air Force Wing Commander, Nakasongola Air Force Base. Before that, he was the Commander of the Air Fore Wing, Entebbe Air Force Base. Prior to that he was a Squadron Commander and Officer Commanding Operations at Entebbe Air Force Wing.

As Chief of Staff of the UPDF Air Force, he replaced Major General Paul Lokech, who was assigned special duties in South Sudan.

On 28 March 2020, he was promoted from the rank of Brigadier to that of Major General.

See also
 Charles Lutaaya
 Gavas Mugyenyi
 James Birungi

References

External links
 Brig Okidi Replaces Maj Gen Lokech as UPDF Airforce Chief of Staff As of 12 December 2019.

Living people
Year of birth missing (living people)
Ugandan military personnel
Uganda People's Defence Force
People from Eastern Region, Uganda
Ugandan aviators